The Europe/Africa Zone was one of the three regional zones of the 2019 Davis Cup.

In the Europe/Africa Zone there are three different tiers, called groups. The winners of the Group I ties in September will earn a place in the 2020 Davis Cup Qualifiers, while the remaining nations in Groups I and II will be allocated a place within their region depending on their position in the Nations Ranking.

Participating nations
<onlyinclude>

Seeds: 

Remaining nations:

Results summary

Results

Bosnia and Herzegovina vs. Czech Republic

Sweden vs. Israel

Finland vs. Austria

Hungary vs. Ukraine

Slovakia vs. Switzerland

Belarus vs. Portugal

References

External links

Americas Zone Group I
Davis Cup Europe/Africa Zone
Davis Cup Europe/Africa Zone Group I